George Bryan is a Scottish curler.

Teams

References

External links
 

Living people

Scottish male curlers
European curling champions
Scottish curling champions
Year of birth missing (living people)